Hotična is a village in the Municipality of Hrpelje-Kozina in the Littoral region of Slovenia.

The local church, built on a hill above the settlement, is dedicated to Saint Pantaleon.

References

External links
Hotična on Geopedia

Populated places in the Municipality of Hrpelje-Kozina